Porthos is a fictional musketeer.

Porthos may also refer to:
 Porthos (building), an apartment building in the Dutch city Eindhoven
 Porthos (Star Trek), a fictional dog in Star Trek
 Seawise Giant, the longest ship ever built, called Porthos at one point
 Porthos, a French luxury car manufacturer based in Boulogne-Billancourt from 1905 to 1914

See also 
 Porthos Range, a mountain range in Antarctica